is a 1983 Japanese anime fantasy comedy film directed by Mamoru Oshii in his film directorial debut. It is the first in the Urusei Yatsura film series based on the manga of the same name by Rumiko Takahashi. It was released in Japan on February 11, 1983 during the second season of the series.

Voice cast

Production
Only You borrows heavily from the Japanese fairy tale of Urashima Tarō. The fairy tale would later inspire the film's sequel, Beautiful Dreamer. It failed to be a film."

Release
Only You was released theatrically in Japan on February 11, 1983 where it was distributed by Toho. AnimEigo released the film in North America on subtitled-LaserDisc on November 11, 1992 as Urusei Yatsura Movie 1–Only You, and then on VHS on June 29, 1995. They later released it on DVD with an English-language dub on October 21, 2003. Discotek Media acquired the North American rights in 2020 and released it on Blu-ray on December 31, 2021, including the AnimEigo dub.

Reception
Allen Divers of Anime News Network gave the subtitled version of the film an overall grade of "A", and the dubbed version a "B" grade, writing that "Despite its age, Urusei Yatsura is a solid series of the romantic comedy genre that has aged very well. Its simple designs and over the top characters makes it a joy for all who watch it. Newer fans may be at a loss as they struggle with the archaic look of the series, but can see the origins of many more current series they enjoy now. Urusei Yatsura is one of the original wacky love tales that helped define the entire genre. Without it and many of Rumiko Takahashi's other works, the romantic comedy genre would not be what it is today. Old school fans will enjoy what this movie has to offer, and those new to the series can sit back and enjoy it as well. A classic story given the royal treatment".

Jasper Sharp of Midnight Eye wrote that the film "throws the viewer completely in at the deep-end, assuming at least some knowledge of the characters and their relationships is in place, though it shouldn't take too long for newcomers to find their feet." Dani Moure of Mania.com called the film "a lot of fun, and for the most part [...] very enjoyable." Chris Beveridge, also of Mania.com, wrote that "the budget is bigger and the designs are more detailed."

References

Footnotes

Sources

External links

1980s fantasy comedy films
1983 anime films
1983 comedy films
1983 films
1983 directorial debut films
Animated comedy films
Anime films based on manga
Comedy anime and manga
Discotek Media
Films based on works by Rumiko Takahashi
Films directed by Mamoru Oshii
1980s Japanese-language films
Japanese animated fantasy films
Japanese fantasy comedy films
Toho animated films
Urusei Yatsura
Films scored by Masamichi Amano